Lindsay Pearson (born 30 December 1955) is a South African cricketer. He played in four first-class matches for Border in 1982/83 and 1983/84.

See also
 List of Border representative cricketers

References

External links
 

1955 births
Living people
South African cricketers
Border cricketers